Betty Hall was an early twentieth-century child film actress.  She is credited in four silent films.

Filmography
 A Lass o' the Looms (1919) as Girl
 The Black Spider (1920) as Irene Carfour
 The Sting of the Lash (1921) as Crissy (6 years)
 The First Woman (1922) as Marie

References

External links
 

English silent film actresses
1910s births
Year of death missing
Date of death missing
20th-century English women
20th-century English people